Andrew Ireland may refer to:

Andrew Ireland (footballer) (born 1953), Australian rules footballer and administrator
Andrew Ireland (rower) (born 1982), Canadian rower
Andy Ireland (born 1930), former member of the US House of Representatives